Han Seok-hyun (born February 6, 1987), known professionally as Raiden, is a South Korean DJ and record producer signed under SM Entertainment and its EDM label ScreaM Records.

Life and career

1987–2013: Early life, education, and career beginnings 
Han Seok-hyun bought a guitar when he was still in middle school. Since he liked music, he decided to pursue it as his career and play with the guitar. Han's parents disapproved of the idea of pursuing it but gave permission when he became a high school student. During a high school festival, he established a band and presented on stage. Because there was no band club at Sehwa High School where he graduated, he made one with his senior students and performed on stage.

In an interview with the Korea Times, Raiden wanted to study in Japan since he was a child; hence he got into Shobi University in 2005 studying guitar while being a rocker and lived there for six years. In 2011, he returned to South Korea and started his band, but realized that living there while being a rocker was hard. Through a high school colleague who studied music with Han, he learned to use turntables and altered his career to a DJ. He revealed that he got "loss in the beginning" as he did not professionally learn to play a turntable and just listened to music from numerous DJs. In three months, he learned to handle the turntable at the Double Eight Club in Sinsa-dong, Seoul, embarking on his music festival debut and as the main DJ at the Ultra Music Festival (UMF) in 2013.

2014–2018: Debut, collaborations, and closing the Winter Olympics 
"Heart of Steel" (2017), inspired by Raiden's 2014 European tour while watching the sunrise in Spain, was released after two years of transformation from progressive house to future bass. Formerly, the song debuted at Ultra Korea 2015 and was re-released as Raiden's new song on January 13, 2017, featuring Bright Lights.

2019–present: Signing with SM Entertainment and Love Right Back 
Raiden, along with Thomas Gold, released a progressive house single, "Someone New" (2019), on June 14, delivering a "mint combination of soulful vocals, bouncy basslines, and uplifting melodies". Upon signing a contract with SM Entertainment, he released his new single, "The Only" (2019), on August 2. It was described as an electronic pop song produced by himself, featuring Red Velvet member Irene. On May 12, Raiden's bright synth-pop, "Yours" (2020), was released along with EXO member, Chanyeol featuring Lee Hi and Changmo. Raiden says the song's release was relevant in the current time of COVID-19 concerns and social distancing; therefore, he "wanted to present the feeling of love and care for each other" as a message. Through SM Station, a pop genre song, "Think About Me" (2020), the collaboration single with Girls' Generation member, Hyo featuring Coogie, was released on October 30. The music video featured the three artists attending the Protocol Labelnight performance during the Amsterdam Dance Event (ADE) in the Netherlands in 2019. DJ Mag indexed Raiden on its DJ Mag Top 100 DJs: The Next 50 list in 2019 in which 50 artists who failed to place on the main DJ Mag Top 100 DJs poll were included, ranking in the 44th place and 144th overall.

On January 1, 2021, Raiden and other SM Entertainment artists performed at the SMTOWN Live Culture Humanity concert. Along with Ginjo and Imlay, he presented EDM performances with a remix setlist of songs by various SM artists as they completed the stage of a "true" music festival. "Runner" (2021) was composed for the League of Legends 2021 and T1's theme song, also for the team's entry song on the League of Legends Champions Korea (LCK). The single with a combination of rock, trap, and EDM genres was released on January 26, with the production of Raiden, EXO's Baekhyun, and Changmo. On July 6, "In Ruin" (2021), an alternative rock genre song composed by Raiden for the original soundtrack of You Are My Spring, sung by American singer-songwriter Nino Lucarelli was released.

Discography

Extended plays

Charted singles

Other singles

Production credits 
All song credits are adapted from the Korea Music Copyright Association's database.

Filmography

Concerts 
Concert participation
 SM Town Live "Culture Humanity" (2021)
 SM Town Live 2022: SMCU Express at Kwangya (2022)
 SM Town Live 2023: SMCU Palace at Kwangya (2023)

Notes

References

External links 
 Official website 

1987 births
SM Entertainment artists
Stmpd Rcrds artists
Electronic musicians
Future bass musicians
Progressive house musicians
South Korean DJs
South Korean record producers
Living people